Calliostoma magaldii is a species of sea snail, a marine gastropod mollusk in the family Calliostomatidae.

Description
The height of the shell attains 12 mm.

Distribution
This species occurs in the Atlantic Ocean off Argentina at depths between 70 m and 100 m.

References

 Caldini C.H. & Prado A.C.G. 1998. Calliostoma magaldi new species from Argentina (Trochidae: Calliostomatinae). Strombus, 3: 1–3.

magaldii
Gastropods described in 1998
Molluscs of Argentina